"Great Southern Land" is a song by Australian rock band Icehouse. It was released on 9 August 1982 as the lead single from their second studio album Primitive Man. It peaked at No. 5 on the Australian Singles Chart, it was later featured in the 1988 Yahoo Serious film Young Einstein, and remains their most popular song according to listeners of Triple M in 2007.

At the 1982 Countdown Music Awards, the song was nominated for Best Australian Single.

It was re-released in the U.S. on Chrysalis Records in 1989 as both a 7" and CD single, to coincide with the U.S. release of the compilation album, Great Southern Land.

On 5 September 2011, "Great Southern Land" re-entered the Australian (ARIA) Singles Chart at No. 66.

There are two versions of the music video. The Australian original version, was filmed at the disused Jones' quarry in Wahroonga in 1982, with solarised clips of the band in daylight and surrounded by camp fires at night. The USA version was made in 1989 for the movie Young Einstein and it has Iva Davies walking around Myall Lakes National Park.

In 1999, Iva Davies was commissioned by Spectak Productions on behalf of the City of Sydney Council to create a musical score to ring in the new Millennium in the forecourt of the Sydney Opera House.  Iva took his song “Great Southern Land” and created a new version dubbed “The Ghost of Time”.  The performance in the forecourt of the Sydney Opera House, featuring Iva Davies, Guy Pratt, Richard Tognetti, Glenn Krawczyk, Sydney Symphony Orchestra, and TaikOz, was seen by millions of people around the world.  
 
In November 2014 the song was selected for inclusion on the Australian National Film & Sound Archive's "Sounds of Australia" list.

The song is also used as the walk out tune for the Australian cricket team for their home matches during the Australian summer.

Qantas added eight 787-9 Dreamliners to its fleet in 2017.  The airlines named each Dreamliner from suggestions and votes from the public.  The name “Great Southern Land” was chosen for the first aircraft out of 45,000 suggestions from the public.  

In January 2018, as part of Triple M's "Ozzest 100", the 'most Australian' songs of all time, "Great Southern Land" was ranked number 4.

Remixes
In 1993, producer Bill Laswell set up a 16-minute remix with Aboriginal Australians, Parliament-Funkadelic alumnus Bernie Worrell and the avant-garde guitarist Buckethead for inclusion on the 1994 remix compilation Full Circle. An edited version named "Byrralku Dhangudha", with unnamed Aborigines partly singing the chorus in language was included on the EP Spin One in 1993. The same edit was released as a single in Germany in 1994 as "Great Southern Land (1994 version)". Another remix version by Endorphin was released on the Icehouse album Meltdown in 2002.

In 2012, Tourism Australia collaborated with Iva Davies to create an online video clip to celebrate the 30th anniversary of the song. The clip includes famous musicians such as Katie Noonan, Cut Copy, Van She and Eskimo Joe, along with everyday Australian characters including an oyster farmer from Barilla Bay in Tasmania and a local choir from the Blue Mountains.

Track listing
All tracks written by Iva Davies.

7" single (Australian release)
 "Great Southern Land" - 5:07
 "Uniform" - 4:03

12" single (Australian release)
 "Great Southern Land" - 5:05
 "Uniform" (extended mix) - 6:02

7" single (U.S. release)
 "Great Southern Land" (edit)
 "Great Southern Land" (album version)

1994 single (German release)
 "Great Southern Land" (1994 version) - 3:47
 "Dedicated To Glam" (12" mix) - 4:25
 "Great Southern Land" (original version) - 5:16

Charts

Weekly charts

Year-end charts

References

1982 singles
Icehouse (band) songs
Australian patriotic songs
Songs written by Iva Davies
Songs about Australia
Song recordings produced by Keith Forsey
1982 songs
Chrysalis Records singles
Regular Records singles